Midnight is a 2003 album by Diane Schuur, of songs written by Barry Manilow.

Track listing 
 "Meet Me, Midnight" (Bruce Sussman) – 2:58
 "When October Goes" (Johnny Mercer) – 4:49
 "Stay Away from Bill" (Eddie Arkin, Sussman) – 3:49
 "I'll Be There" (Arkin, Marty Panzer) – 4:19
 "Consider the Point from Both Ends" (Adrienne Anderson, Arkin) – 4:12
 "What Is Love?" (Arkin) – 3:31
 "He Loved Me" (Arkin, Panzer) – 4:06
 "Southwind" (Mercer) – 2:39
 "Our Love Will Always Be There" (Anderson, Arkin) – 3:32
 "No Heartache Tonight" (Arkin) – 3:32
 "Good-Bye My Love" (Anderson) – 3:58
 "Life Is Good" (Panzer) – 4:02
 "Anytime" – 3:01

All songs written by Barry Manilow, co-writers indicated.

Personnel

Performance 

 Diane Schuur - vocals, piano
 Barry Manilow - vocals, arranger, producer, rhythm arrangements
 Bill Elliott Swing Orchestra:
 Chuck Berghofer - double bass
 Abraham Laboriel
 Bill Liston -clarinet, saxophone, tenor saxophone
 Peter Erskine - drums
 Harvey Mason
 Dan Higgins - flute, alto saxophone
 Eddie Arkin - guitar, arranger, producer, rhythm arrangements, orchestral arrangements
 Oscar Castro-Neves - guitar
 Anthony Wilson
 Tommy Morgan - harmonica
 Gayle Levant - harp
 Alan Estes - percussion, vibraphone
 Paulinho Da Costa - percussion
 Alan Broadbent - piano
 Randy Kerber
 Andy Martin - trombone
 Warren Luening - trumpet, flugelhorn
 Phillip Ingram - vocals, background vocals
 Yvonne Williams
 Karrin Allyson
 Brian McKnight

Production 

 Bruce Dukov - concert master
 Jorge Calandrelli - conductor, rhythm arrangements, orchestral arrangements
 Joe Soldo - contractor, orchestra contractor
 Jill Simonsen - design
 Don Murray - engineer, mastering, mixing
 Patricia Arkin - executive producer
 Glen Barros
 John Burk
 Garry Kief
 Robert Vosgien - mastering
 Randee Saint Nicholas - photography
 Diego Uchitel
 Valerie Whitesell - production coordination
 Wil Donovan - studio assistant
 Bruce Monical
 Abbey Anna - art direction
 Charles Paakkari - assistant engineer
 Seth Presant
 Marc Hulett - assistant

References 

2003 albums
Diane Schuur albums
Albums produced by Phil Ramone
Concord Records albums